Thomas Enqvist was the defending champion but lost in the second round to Jaime Yzaga.

Jiří Novák won in the final 6–4, 6–4 against Brett Steven.

Seeds
A champion seed is indicated in bold text while text in italics indicates the round in which that seed was eliminated.

  Thomas Enqvist (second round)
  MaliVai Washington (quarterfinals)
  Jonas Björkman (first round)
  Jakob Hlasek (first round)
  Brett Steven (final)
  Àlex Corretja (second round)
  Francisco Clavet (second round)
  Jiří Novák (champion)

Draw

External links
 1996 BellSouth Open draw

ATP Auckland Open
1996 ATP Tour